Erigone is a genus of  dwarf spiders that was first described by Jean Victoire Audouin in 1826. They are carnivorous, preying on small insects such as psylla and flies. One of the distinctive characters for this genus is the presence of teeth bordering the carapace.

Species 
Many species originally placed here have been transferred to other genera.  it contains 103 species and nine subspecies:
E. acuta Tanasevitch, 2021 – Nepal
E. albescens Banks, 1898 – USA
E. aletris Crosby & Bishop, 1928 – USA, Canada. Introduced to Britain, Italy
E. allani Chamberlin & Ivie, 1947 – USA (Alaska)
E. alsaida Crosby & Bishop, 1928 – USA
E. angela Chamberlin & Ivie, 1939 – USA
E. antarctica Simon, 1884 – Chile
E. antegona Chickering, 1970 – Panama
E. apophysalis Tanasevitch, 2017 – Indonesia (Sumatra)
E. aptuna Chickering, 1970 – Panama
E. arctica (White, 1852) – North America, Northern Europe, Russia (Europe to East Siberia)
Erigone a. maritima Kulczyński, 1902 – Western, Central and Northern Europe, Russia (Altai)
Erigone a. palaearctica Braendegaard, 1934 – Svalbard, Russia (Europe to West Siberia)
Erigone a. sibirica Kulczyński, 1908 – Russia (Siberia)
Erigone a. soerenseni Holm, 1956 – Greenland
E. arcticola Chamberlin & Ivie, 1947 – Russia (Europe to Far North-East), USA (Alaska)
E. arctophylacis Crosby & Bishop, 1928 – USA, Canada
E. aspura Chamberlin & Ivie, 1939 – USA (Alaska)
E. atra Blackwall, 1833 – North America, Europe, Caucasus, Russia (Europe to Far East), Kazakhstan, Central Asia, China, Mongolia, Korea, Japan
E. autumnalis Emerton, 1882 – North and Central America. Introduced to Azores, Europe, United Arab Emirates, New Caledonia
E. barrowsi Crosby & Bishop, 1928 – USA, Mexico
E. benes Chamberlin & Ivie, 1939 – USA
E. bereta Chickering, 1970 – Panama
E. bifurca Locket, 1982 – India, Malaysia (mainland), Philippines, Indonesia (Krakatau)
E. blaesa Crosby & Bishop, 1928 – USA, Canada
E. brevipes Tu & Li, 2004 – Vietnam
E. canthognatha Chamberlin & Ivie, 1935 – USA
E. clavipalpis Millidge, 1991 – Peru
E. coloradensis Keyserling, 1886 – USA, Canada
E. convalescens Jocqué, 1985 – Comoros
E. cristatopalpus Simon, 1884 – North America, Europe, Russia (Urals to Far East), Kazakhstan, Mongolia
E. crosbyi Schenkel, 1950 – USA
E. dentichelis Miller, 1970 – Angola
E. denticulata Chamberlin & Ivie, 1939 – USA
E. dentigera O. Pickard-Cambridge, 1874 – North America, Europe, Caucasus, Russia (Europe to Far East)
E. dentipalpis (Wider, 1834) – Europe, Turkey, Caucasus, Russia (Europe to Far East), Kazakhstan, Central Asia, China
Erigone d. syriaca O. Pickard-Cambridge, 1872 – Syria
E. dentosa O. Pickard-Cambridge, 1894 – USA to Guatemala. Introduced to Belgium
E. digena Chickering, 1970 – Panama, Jamaica, Puerto Rico
E. dipona Chickering, 1970 – Panama
E. dumitrescuae Georgescu, 1969 – Romania
E. edentata Saito & Ono, 2001 – Korea, Japan
E. eisenschmidti Wunderlich, 1976 – Australia (Queensland)
E. ephala Crosby & Bishop, 1928 – USA, Canada
E. fellita Keyserling, 1886 – Peru
E. fluctuans O. Pickard-Cambridge, 1875 – France
E. fluminea Millidge, 1991 – Venezuela
E. grandidens Tu & Li, 2004 – China, Vietnam
E. himeshimensis Strand, 1918 – Japan
E. hydrophytae Ivie & Barrows, 1935 – USA
E. hypenema Crosby & Bishop, 1928 – USA
E. hypoarctica Eskov, 1989 – Russia (Europe to Far East)
E. infernalis Keyserling, 1886 – USA
E. irrita Jocqué, 1984 – South Africa
E. jaegeri Baehr, 1984 – Central Europe, China
E. jammu Tanasevitch, 2018 – India
E. jugorum Simon, 1884 – France
E. koratensis Strand, 1918 – Japan
E. koshiensis Oi, 1960 – China, Korea, Taiwan, Japan
E. lata Song & Li, 2008 – China
E. longipalpis (Sundevall, 1830) (type) – Europe, Caucasus, Russia (Europe to Middle Siberia), China, Japan
Erigone l. meridionalis Simon, 1884 – Britain, France
Erigone l. pirini Deltshev, 1983 – Bulgaria
E. malvari Barrion & Litsinger, 1995 – Philippines
E. matanuskae Chamberlin & Ivie, 1947 – USA (Alaska)
E. miniata Baert, 1990 – Ecuador (Galapagos Is.)
E. monterreyensis Gertsch & Davis, 1937 – Mexico
E. neocaledonica Kritscher, 1966 – New Caledonia
E. nepalensis Wunderlich, 1983 – Nepal
E. nigrimana Thorell, 1875 – Italy
E. nitidithorax Miller, 1970 – Angola
E. ostiaria Crosby & Bishop, 1928 – USA
E. palustris Millidge, 1991 – Peru
E. paradisicola Crosby & Bishop, 1928 – USA
E. pauperula (Bösenberg & Strand, 1906) – Japan
E. personata Gertsch & Davis, 1936 – USA
E. poeyi Simon, 1898 – St. Vincent
E. praecursa Chamberlin & Ivie, 1939 – USA
E. prominens Bösenberg & Strand, 1906 – Asia. Introduced to Africa, Australia, New Zealand
E. promiscua (O. Pickard-Cambridge, 1873) – Europe
E. pseudovagans Caporiacco, 1935 – Karakorum
E. psychrophila Thorell, 1871 – North America, Northern Europe, Russia (Europe to East Siberia)
E. reducta Schenkel, 1950 – USA
E. remota L. Koch, 1869 – Europe, Russia (Europe to north-east Siberia), Kyrgyzstan
Erigone r. dentigera Simon, 1926 – Switzerland
E. rohtangensis Tikader, 1981 – India
E. rutila Millidge, 1995 – Thailand
E. sagibia Strand, 1918 – Japan
E. sagicola Dönitz & Strand, 1906 – Japan
E. sinensis Schenkel, 1936 – Russia (West Siberia to Far East), Kazakhstan, Kyrgyzstan, Mongolia, China
E. sirimonensis Bosmans, 1977 – Kenya
E. spadix Thorell, 1875 – Italy
E. stygia Gertsch, 1973 – Hawaii
E. sumatrana Tanasevitch, 2017 – Indonesia (Sumatra)
E. svenssoni Holm, 1975 – Scandinavia, Russia (Europe to West Siberia)
E. tamazunchalensis Gertsch & Davis, 1937 – Mexico
E. tanana Chamberlin & Ivie, 1947 – USA (Alaska)
E. tenuimana Simon, 1884 – Europe (Alps)
E. tepena Chickering, 1970 – Jamaica
E. tirolensis L. Koch, 1872 – North America, Europe, Russia (Europe to Far North East)
E. tolucana Gertsch & Davis, 1937 – Mexico
E. tristis (Banks, 1892) – USA
E. uintana Chamberlin & Ivie, 1935 – USA
E. uliginosa Millidge, 1991 – Peru
E. watertoni Simon, 1898 – St. Vincent
E. welchi Jackson, 1911 – Ireland, Britain, France, Scandinavia, Estonia, Latvia
E. whitneyana Chamberlin & Ivie, 1935 – USA
E. whymperi O. Pickard-Cambridge, 1877 – Canada, Greenland, Faeroes, Norway, Russia (Europe, West Siberia), Mongolia
Erigone w. minor Jackson, 1933 – Canada
E. wiltoni Locket, 1973 – New Zealand, Comoros
E. zabluta Keyserling, 1886 – Peru
E. zheduoshanensis Song & Li, 2008 – China

References

External links 
 Erigone on Fauna Europaea
 Tamerlan Thorell (1895): Descriptive catalogue of the spiders of Burma

Araneomorphae genera
Cosmopolitan spiders
Linyphiidae
Taxa named by Jean Victoire Audouin